"Celebrity Status" is a song recorded by Canadian pop rock band Marianas Trench. It was released on April 6, 2010 as the fourth single from their second studio album Masterpiece Theatre. The song peaked at number 24 on the Canadian Hot 100 and is certified gold in Canada.

Background and composition
The song is about the music business in a satirical matter. The track runs at 164 BPM and is in the key of E major.

The song was featured along with Pink's Raise Your Glass in the University of British Columbia's lipdub video released on April 8, 2011.

Awards and nominations

Accolades

Music video
The music video for "Celebrity Status" was directed by Colin Minihan and Tony Mirza. It features Josh Ramsay in his home at night channel surfing on his TV. Throughout the video, parodies of TV shows and commercials are shown, typically with the band members playing the roles. These include a cooking show, a sitcom, CSI (on the Ox channel), Cops, a courtroom show and 90210. The band is seen performing in between the shows. Shots of Josh as the viewer are shown throughout, noting his disengagement with what is on the television. During the last chorus, a fire starts erupting in some of the shows. The TV catches fire, waking him a now sleeping Josh, and he stares as the fire spreads to the curtain.

The music video earned two nominations at the 2010 MuchMusic Video Awards for "UR Fave Video of the Year" and "Pop Video or the Year". It was also nominated for "Video of the Year" at the 2011 Independent Music Awards.

Charts

Weekly charts

Year-end charts

Certifications

References

2010 singles
2010 songs
Songs written by Josh Ramsay
Marianas Trench (band) songs